Godan Express (Hindi: गोदान एक्स्प्रेस) is a three day a week express train of the Indian Railways, running between Lokmanya Tilak Terminus, Mumbai, the capital city of Maharashtra and Chhapra, the prominent city of Bihar. It is numbered as 11059/60.

Arrival and Departure
Train No. 11059 departs from Lokmanya Tilak terminus on Tue/Thu/Sat at 10:55 AM and arrives at Chhapra 21:05 PM the following day.
Train No. 11060 departs from Chhapra on Mon/Thu/Sat at 05:30 AM and arrives at Lokmanya Tilak Terminus 15:55 PM the following day.

Time Table
From Lokmanya Tilak (LTT) to Chhapra (CPR)

From Chapra (CPR) to Lokmanya Tilak T

Coach composition
The train generally consists of a total number of 22 LHB Coaches as follows:
 1 AC II Tier
 5 AC III Tier
 1 Economy AC III Tier
 10 Sleeper Class
 3 Unreserved
 1 Unreserved cum Luggage/Brake VAN
 1 EOG

Locomotive
 WAP-4 / WAP-7: Lokmanya Tilak Terminus - Chhapra Junction

 Loco Reversal: Prayagraj Junction & Bhatni Junction

Average Speed
 11059DN- 52 km/h
 11060UP- 51 km/h

RSA - Rake Sharing Arrangement
This Train shares Rake with Godan express

See also
 Godaan Express

References

External links
 India Rail Info: Chhapra Express, 11059
 India Rail Info: Chhapra Express, 11060

Rail transport in Maharashtra
Rail transport in Madhya Pradesh
Rail transport in Uttar Pradesh
Transport in Mumbai
Rail transport in Bihar
Express trains in India